Victor Namo also known as  V.I.C (born 3 November 1988 in Jos) is a footballer who currently plays for Al Ahly Benghazi in the Libyan Premier League.

Career 
Namo began his career with Yobe Desert Stars and was in 2006 scouted from Kano Pillars F.C. He had  trials in Vietnam and Israel in 2008. In October 2009, Victor was linked with Sudanese top clubs Al-Merreikh and Al-Hilal Omdurman.

After a successful career with Kano Pillars Football club where he played from 2006-2012 helping the club win its first Nigerian Premier League in 2007-08 and his goal scoring form helped in eliminating  the likes of Al Ahly scoring both at home and away in that encounter at the CAF Champions League he finished the campaign with 7 goals that season. He left the club immediately after helping Kano Pillars secure its second League title in 2011-2012 season to Nasarawa United.

In his debut season at Nasarawa United, he does what he knows best which is finding the back of the net and finished the season as top scorer in the league with 19 goals.

In January 2014, Namo left Nigeria for Libyan Premier League giants Al Ahly Benghazi.

Achievements
Nigerian Premier League
Champions (3): 2007-08, 2011-12, 
Runners-up (1): 2009-10

Nigerian Super Cup
Runners-up (1): 2012

Performance in CAF competitions
2009 - Semi-Finals

Personal Achievements
Nigeria Premier League Top Scorer (1): 2013

References 

Living people
1988 births
Association football forwards
Nigerian footballers
Nigerian expatriate footballers
Sportspeople from Jos
Kano Pillars F.C. players
Expatriate footballers in Libya
Nigeria Professional Football League players